Odin is an unincorporated community in Barton County, Kansas, United States.  As of the 2020 census, the population of the community and nearby areas was 87.  It is located northwest of Claflin at the intersection of NE 140 Rd and NE 90 Ave.

History
Odin had a post office from 1877 until 1906. The post office was re-established in 1950, and finally closed again in 1995.

Geography
Odin is located at  (38.56612, -98.60869).

Demographics

For statistical purposes, the United States Census Bureau has defined Odin as a census-designated place (CDP).

Education
The community is served by Central Plains USD 112 public school district.

Odin schools were closed in 1974 through school unification. The Odin High School mascot was Odin Tigers.

References

Further reading

External links
 Barton County maps: Current, Historic, KDOT

Census-designated places in Barton County, Kansas
Census-designated places in Kansas